A leader writer is a senior journalist in a British newspaper who is charged with writing the paper's editorial either in the absence of the editor or in cases where the editor chooses not to write editorials because their editorial skills may rest more in management of the company than in writing daily editorials. Some major newspapers have a number of leader writers. Often different individuals may write editorials in their own specialist areas, for example, the political editor would write some or all editorials on political matters, and so on. Leader writers are often also columnists in their newspapers. Outside the UK, leader writers are known as editorial writers.

Some leader writers include:
Daniel Finkelstein
Amanda Platell
Jonathan Freedland
David Aaronovitch
Libby Purves
Matthew Parris
Simon Hoggart
Julia Hartley-Brewer
Patrick Hennessy
Quentin Letts
Simon Heffer
Peter Hitchens
Melanie Phillips
Oliver Kamm
Trevor Kavanagh
Michael White
Peter Oborne
Andrew Rawnsley
Annunziata Rees-Mogg
Peter Riddell
Michael Portillo
Kevin Maguire
Jackie Ashley
Simon Jenkins
Polly Toynbee
Tim Stanley
Michael Toner
Liz Forgan

Journalism lists
Lists of journalists